A list of films produced in the Soviet Union in 1970 (see 1970 in film).

1970

External links
 Soviet films of 1970 at the Internet Movie Database

1970
Soviet
Films